The Holly SS Ranch Barn, or Double S Ranch Barn, at 407 West Vinson in Holly, Colorado, was built in 1879.  It is located south of the railroad tracks on the south side of Holly.

It was built for rancher Hiram S. Holly who settled in the area which later became the town of Holly in 1871.

It is a one-and-a-half story structure of "transverse crib" type, having a central aisle with spaces for stalls or cribs on both sides. A tack room at the northeast corner of the barn gives it an overall L-shape.  It was built by SS Ranch carpenter John Gores.

The building has a gable roof.

On the north side of the railroad tracks is the town's city hall, in the railroad station building.

It was listed on the National Register of Historic Places in 2004.

References

External links

Barns on the National Register of Historic Places in Colorado
National Register of Historic Places in Prowers County, Colorado
Buildings and structures completed in 1879